The rotta (also chrotta or hrotta) is a medieval stringed instrument derived from the Greek cithara.

The early rotta
The rotta possessed, in common with all other forerunners of the violin, the chief structural features of the cithara: the box sound chest composed of back and belly either flat or delicately arched connected by ribs. The rotta represents the first step in the evolution of the cithara, when arms and cross-bar were replaced by a frame joined to the body, the strings being usually restricted to eight or less. Examples of these early rottas abound in miniatures from the 8th to the 12th century or even the 14th. A real specimen of wood was found in an Alamannic tomb of the 4th to the 7th century at Oberflacht.

First transition
The next transition was the addition of a finger board and the consequent reduction of the strings to three or four, since each string was now capable of producing several notes. A Carolingian Bible presented to Charles the Bald by Count Vivian of Tours has a fine example of the rotta at this stage, in which the artist has reproduced the position of the fingers of the left hand stopping the strings, and of the right hand plucking them.

Last transition
In the final transition preceding the transformation of the rotta into the guitar, the rotta appears as a guitar-shaped instrument without neck or head.  At this point it has holes in the body large enough to allow the hand to pass through on each side of the strings. At first this instrument, which developed into the crwth, was twanged with the fingers, but in the 11th century it was played with a bow, the bridge having been slightly raised on feet.

The first (and perhaps also the last) transition was accomplished in Christian Asia, where, however, the upper frame of the earliest rotta seems to have been at once discarded in favour of a long neck with frets, for which the tanbur undoubtedly supplied the idea. Of the rotta, there were two distinct types, the one derived from the cithara, the rotta proper, and the other derived from the lyre, which survived to the 18th century as the Welsh crwth.

Guitar
As soon as a neck was added to the rotta's guitar-shaped body, the instrument ceased to be a rotta and became a guitar, or a guitar fiddle if played with a bow.

References
 

Early musical instruments